Tornado Mountain is located on the border of Alberta and British Columbia on the Continental Divide. It is Alberta's 48th most prominent mountain. It was named in 1915 by Morrison P. Bridgland.

See also
 List of peaks on the British Columbia–Alberta border
 Boreal Plains Ecozone (CEC)

References

Three-thousanders of Alberta
Three-thousanders of British Columbia
Canadian Rockies